Yolanda Henry (born December 2, 1964) is a retired American track and field athlete who specialized in the high jump. She represented her country at one outdoor and four indoor World Championships. In addition she won the silver at the 1990 Goodwill Games.

Her personal bests in the event are 2.00 metres outdoors (Seville 1990) and 1.96 metres indoors (New York 1991).

International competitions

1No mark in the final

References

All-Athletics profile

1964 births
Living people
American female high jumpers
World Athletics Championships athletes for the United States
Goodwill Games medalists in athletics
Competitors at the 1990 Goodwill Games
21st-century American women